Symmes Township, Ohio may refer to:

Symmes Township, Hamilton County, Ohio
Symmes Township, Lawrence County, Ohio

Ohio township disambiguation pages